Kaitano Tembo (born 22 July 1970) is a retired Zimbabwean football defender and a Former SuperSport United head coach. A Zimbabwean international, he played at the 1999, 2000 and 2003 COSAFA Cup and the 2004 African Cup of Nations. He has managed clubs in South Africa.

References 

1970 births
Living people
Zimbabwean footballers
Zimbabwe international footballers
Association football defenders
Zimbabwean expatriate footballers
Expatriate soccer players in South Africa
Zimbabwean expatriate sportspeople in South Africa
Dynamos F.C. players
SuperSport United F.C. players
Zimbabwean football managers
Zimbabwean expatriate football managers
Expatriate soccer managers in South Africa
SuperSport United F.C. managers